This list deals with association football rivalries around Asia and Oceania among clubs. This includes local derbies as well as matches between teams further afield. For rivalries between international teams and club rivalries around the world, see List of association football rivalries.

Only clubs of federations which are members of AFC or OFC are included.

The article is alphabetically split into OFC and the AFC federations: AFF (South East Asia and Australasia), CAFA (Central Asia), EAFF (East Asia), SAFF (South Asia), and WAFF (West Asia).

Clubs in AFF

Australia

A-League
 Melbourne Derby: Melbourne City FC vs. Melbourne Victory FC.
 Sydney Derby: Sydney FC vs. Western Sydney Wanderers FC.
 The Big Blue: Melbourne Victory FC vs. Sydney FC.
 The F3 Derby: Central Coast Mariners FC vs. Newcastle United Jets FC.
 The Distance Derby: Perth Glory FC vs. Wellington Phoenix FC.
 The Original Derby: Adelaide United FC vs. Melbourne Victory FC.
 Westgate Derby: Melbourne Victory FC vs. Western United FC
 Wellington Phoenix FC–Western United FC rivalry: Wellington Phoenix FC vs. Western United FC
 Central Coast Mariners FC–Western Sydney Wanderers FC rivalry:Central Coast Mariners FC vs. Western Sydney Wanderers FC

Lower Leagues
 Sydney Olympic FC vs. Sydney United 58 FC
 Marconi Stallions FC vs. Sydney Olympic FC
 Sydney Olympic FC vs. APIA Leichhardt Tigers FC 
 APIA Leichhardt Tigers FC vs. Marconi Stallions FC
 Brisbane City Football Club vs. Brisbane Olympic
 Heidelberg United FC vs. South Melbourne FC
 South Melbourne FC vs. Melbourne Knights FC
 Adelaide Derby: Adelaide City FC vs. West Adelaide SC
 Frank Farina Cup: Far North Queensland FC vs. Northern Fury FC.

Indonesia

Old Indonesia derby (Indonesia El Clásico): Persija Jakarta vs. Persib Bandung
 Super East Java Derby: Persebaya Surabaya vs. Arema FC
 Pasundan Derby: Persib Bandung vs. Persikabo 1973
Suramadu Derby : Persebaya Surabaya vs. Madura United
Eastern Indonesia Derby : PSM Makassar vs. Persipura Jayapura
 Borneo Derby: Persiba Balikpapan vs. Mitra Kukar FC vs. Borneo FC vs. Barito Putera	
 Sumatra Derby: Semen Padang FC vs. Sriwijaya FC vs. PSMS Medan
Central Java Derby: PSIS Semarang vs. Persis Solo
Mataram Derby: Persis Solo vs. PSIM Yogyakarta
Madura Derby: Madura United vs. Madura FC
Yogyakarta Derby: PSIM Yogyakarta vs. PSS Sleman
Capital City Derby: Persija Jakarta vs. Persitara Jakarta Utara
Bandung Derby: Persib Bandung vs. Persikab Bandung
Malang Derby: Arema FC vs. Persema Malang
Bogor Derby: Persikabo 1973 vs. PSB Bogor
Bekasi Derby: Persipasi Bekasi vs. Persikasi Bekasi
Tangerang Derby: Persita Tangerang vs. Persikota Tangerang
Aceh Derby: Persiraja Banda Aceh vs. PSAP Sigli
North Sumatra Derby: PSMS Medan vs. PSDS Deli Serdang
Palembang Derby: Sriwijaya FC vs. PS Palembang
Minahasa Derby: Persma Manado vs. Persmin Minahasa
North Maluku Derby: Persiter Ternate vs. Persikota Tidore
Sentani Derby: Persipura Jayapura vs. Persidafon Dafonsoro

Malaysia
Malaysian Giants Clash: Selangor vs. Johor Darul Ta'zim F.C.
East Coast Derby : Terengganu vs. Kelantan vs. Pahang 
Borneo Derby : Sabah vs. Sarawak vs. Sarawak United
Klang Valley Derby : Selangor vs. Kuala Lumpur
Royal Derby : Johor Darul Ta'zim F.C. vs. Pahang
Selangor Derby : Selangor vs. Petaling Jaya City
Naning Derby: Negeri Sembilan vs. Melaka United
Uniform Derby : Armed Forces F.C. vs. PDRM FA
University Derby : UKM F.C. vs. UiTM F.C.
Northern Derby : Kedah vs Perak vs Penang
Kelantan Derby : Kelantan vs. Kelantan United
Sarawak Derby : Sarawak United vs. Kuching City

Myanmar
 Myanmar Derby: Yangon United vs. Yadanarbon

Philippines
 Visayas Clásico: 
Ceres–Negros F.C. vs. Global Cebu F.C. (defunct as Ceres–Negros rebranded as United City and cease to be associated with Negros, and with the blacklisting of Global after relocating to Makati)
Ceres–Negros F.C. vs. Kaya F.C.–Iloilo (defunct as Ceres–Negros rebranded as United City and cease to be associated with Negros)
Dynamic Herb Cebu F.C. vs. Kaya F.C.–Iloilo 
 Capital Clásico: F.C. Meralco Manila vs. Kaya F.C.–Makati (defunct as Meralco Manila disbanded, and Kaya relocated to Iloilo)
Armed Forces rivalry: Philippine Army F.C. vs. Philippine Air Force F.C. (not currently contested in competitive football)

Singapore
Uniformed Derby: Warriors FC vs. Home United FC

Thailand
 Muangthong-Buriram rivalry: Muangthong United vs. Buriram United
 Thailand Clasico: Muangthong United vs. Chonburi
Muangthong-Tharuea rivalry: Muangthong United vs. Port

Vietnam
 Hanoi FC-Hoàng Anh Gia Lai rivalry(National Team Derby): Hanoi FC vs. Hoang Anh Gia Lai FC
 Hanoi FC-Sông Lam Nghệ An rivalry: Hanoi FC vs. Sông Lam Nghệ An
 Hanoi FC-Becamex Bình Dương rivalry: Hanoi FC vs. Becamex Bình Dương FC
 Saigon Derby: Hồ Chí Minh City F.C. vs. Sài Gòn F.C.
 Capital Derby: Hanoi FC vs. Viettel FC
 Hanoi FC-Hồ Chí Minh City FC rivalry: Hanoi FC vs. Ho Chi Minh City FC
 Northern Derby: Hanoi FC vs. Haiphong FC
 Central Derby: SHB Da Nang FC vs. Quang Nam FC
 Nghe-Tinh Derby: Song Lam Nghe An FC vs. Hong Linh Ha Tinh FC

Clubs in CAFA

Iran
 Tehran Derby: Esteghlal vs. Persepolis
 Isfahan Derby: Sepahan vs. Zob Ahan 
 El Gilano: Damash or Sepidrood vs. Malavan
 Persepolis–Sepahan rivalry: Persepolis vs. Sepahan
 Esteghlal–Sepahan rivalry: Esteghlal vs. Sepahan
 Mashhad Derby: Aboomoslem or Siah Jamegan vs. Payam or Padideh
 Persepolis–Tractor rivalry: Persepolis vs. Tractor
 Esteghlal–Tractor rivalry: Esteghlal vs. Tractor
 Ahvaz Derby: Foolad vs. Esteghlal Khuz

Uzbekistan
Tashkent derby: Lokomotiv Tashkent vs. Pakhtakor Tashkent vs. Bunyodkor Tashkent
Uzbek El Clasico: Pakhtakor Tashkent vs. Neftchi Ferghana

Clubs in EAFF

China (People's Republic of)
 National derby: Beijing Guoan vs. Shanghai Shenhua
 Beijing derby: Beijing Guoan vs. Beijing BIT vs. Beijing BSU
 Guangzhou derby/Canton derby: Guangzhou F.C. vs. Guangzhou City
 Jing-Jin derby: Beijing Guoan vs. Tianjin Jinmen Tiger vs. Beijing BIT vs. Beijing BSU
 Shanghai derby: Shanghai Shenhua vs. Shanghai Port vs. Shanghai Jiading Huilong
 Yangtze Delta derby: Shanghai Shenhua vs. Shanghai Port vs. Zhejiang Professional vs. Kunshan F.C. vs. Suzhou Dongwu vs. Nantong Zhiyun vs. Nanjing City
 Pearl River Delta derby: Guangzhou F.C. vs. Guangzhou City vs. Shenzhen F.C.

Hong Kong
The Classic Derby: South China vs. Kitchee (Hong Kong El Clásico)
South-East Clash: Eastern vs. South China
The Majestic of Blue/Double Blues:  Kitchee vs. Eastern
South China AA–Pegasus rivalry (Derby of Bros): South China vs. TSW Pegasus
New Territories Derby: Tai Po FC vs. Yuen Long FC

Japan
 Osaka derby: Gamba Osaka vs. Cerezo Osaka
 Saitama derby: Urawa Red Diamonds vs. Omiya Ardija
 Tokyo derby: F.C. Tokyo vs. Tokyo Verdy
 Gamba-Urawa rivalry: Urawa Red Diamonds vs. Gamba Osaka
 Yokohama derby: Yokohama FC vs. Yokohama F. Marinos
 Michinoku derby: Vegalta Sendai vs. Montedio Yamagata
 Ōu Honsen:  Blaublitz Akita vs. Montedio Yamagata
 Fukuoka derby: Avispa Fukuoka vs. Giravanz Kitakyushu
 Shizuoka derby: Júbilo Iwata vs. Shimizu S-Pulse
 Chiba derby: Kashiwa Reysol vs. JEF United
 Shinshū derby: Matsumoto Yamaga vs. AC Nagano Parceiro

North Korea
Pyongyang derby: 25 April vs. Pyongyang SC

South Korea

Active derbies
Hyundai derby/Korean El Clásico: Jeonbuk Hyundai Motors FC vs. Ulsan Hyundai FC
Donghaean derby: Ulsan Hyundai vs. Pohang Steelers
Super Match: Suwon Samsung Bluewings vs. FC Seoul
Gyeongin derby: FC Seoul vs. Incheon United FC
University derby (U-League): Yonsei University vs. Korea University

Defunct derbies
Magyedaejeon: Seongnam Ilhwa Chunma vs. Suwon Samsung Bluewings
Kyungsung FC–Pyongyang FC rivalry: Kyungsung FC vs. Pyongyang FC
Seoul Dongdaemun derby: Seongnam Ilhwa Chunma vs. LG Cheetahs, Yukong Elephants vs. Ilhwa Chunma, LG Cheetahs vs Yukong Elephants derbies held before 1996 between former clubs based in Seoul

Clubs in OFC

New Zealand
Auckland derby: Auckland City vs. Waitakere United
Dominion Road derby: Auckland City vs. Auckland United

Papua New Guinea
National derby: Hekari United vs. Lae City

Tahiti
National derby: A.S. Pirae vs. A.S. Vénus

Clubs in SAFF

Bangladesh
 Dhaka Derby : Mohammedan vs. Abahani
Abahani Derby : Abahani Limited Dhaka Vs. Chittagong Abahani Limited

India
 Kolkata Derby: ATK Mohun Bagan vs East Bengal
 Kolkata Mini Derby: Mohammedan vs ATK Mohun Bagan, Mohammedan vs East Bengal
 South Indian Derby: Bengaluru FC vs Chennaiyin vs Kerala Blasters
 Northeast Derby: Shillong Lajong vs Aizawl
 Imphal Derby: NEROCA vs TRAU
 Goa Derby: Between Churchill Brothers, Dempo, Salgaocar and Sporting Clube de Goa
 Shillong Derby: Shillong Lajong vs Royal Wahingdoh

Nepal
Kathmandu derby: Manang Marsyangdi Club vs Three Star Club

Clubs in WAFF

Iraq
Baghdad Derbies (also known as Iraqi El Clásicos): Al-Quwa Al-Jawiya vs. Al-Shorta vs. Al-Talaba vs. Al-Zawraa
Basra Derby: Al-Minaa vs. Naft Al-Janoob	
Northern Derby: Duhok vs. Erbil	
Duhok Derby: Duhok vs. Zakho	
Najaf Derby: Al-Najaf vs. Naft Al-Wasat

Jordan
 Amman Derby: Al-Faisaly vs. Al-Wehdat

Kuwait
Kuwaiti El Clásico: Qadsia SC vs. Al-Arabi SC

Lebanon
Beirut derby: Nejmeh vs. Ansar
Al Ahed FC–Al Ansar FC rivalry: Ahed vs. Ansar
Al Ahed FC–Nejmeh SC rivalry: Ahed vs. Nejmeh
Achrafieh derby: Racing vs. Sagesse
Armenian derby: Homenmen vs. Homenetmen
Bar Elias derby: Nahda vs. Nasser
Dahieh derby: Bourj vs. Shabab Sahel vs. Shabab Bourj
Mountain derby: Safa vs. Akhaa Ahli
North derby: Tripoli vs. Salam Zgharta vs. Egtmaaey
Safa SC–Al Ansar FC rivalry: Safa vs. Ansar
Safa SC–Nejmeh SC rivalry: Safa vs. Nejmeh
South derby: Tadamon Sour vs. Ghazieh
Tripoli derby: Tripoli vs. Egtmaaey
Tyre derby: Tadamon Sour vs. Salam Sour

Saudi Arabia
 Saudi El Clasico: Al-Hilal vs. Al-Ittihad
 Riyadh derby: Al-Hilal vs Al-Nassr
 Jeddah Derby: Al-Ittihad vs. Al-Ahli
Buraidah Derby: Al-Raed vs. Al-Taawoun
Al-Hasa derby: Hajer FC vs. Al-Fateh FC
Al-Sharqiyah derby: Ettifaq FC vs. Al-Qadsiah FC

Syria
Aleppo derby: Al-Ittihad vs. Al-Hurriya
Damascus derby: Al-Jaish vs. Al-Wahda
Hama derby: Taliya vs. Nawair
Homs derby: Al-Karamah vs. Al-Wathba
Latakia derby: Tishreen vs. Hutteen

United Arab Emirates
Al Classico: Al Ain vs. Al Wasl vs. Al-Wahda
UAE Pro Era Rivalry: Al Ain vs Shabab Al Ahli
Bur Dubai Derby: Al Nasr vs. Al Wasl
Abu Dhabi City Derby: Al Jazira vs Al Wahda

References

External links
 FootballDerbies.com
 FIFA.com
 EuroRivals.net – fixtures, results and videos of football derbies
 50 Greatest Rivalries in World Football – Bleacher Report

Asia and Oceania
Rivalries
Rivalries